Henrik Sørensen (27 May 1897 – 19 February 1976) was a Danish athlete. He competed in the men's individual cross country event at the 1920 Summer Olympics.

References

External links
 

1897 births
1976 deaths
People from Ringsted
Athletes (track and field) at the 1920 Summer Olympics
Danish male long-distance runners
Olympic athletes of Denmark
Olympic cross country runners
Sportspeople from Region Zealand